Rock Creek is a census-designated place in Jefferson County, Alabama, United States. Its location is northwest of Hueytown. At the 2020 census, the population was 1,471. This area was damaged by an F5 tornado on April 8, 1998. An EF2 tornado struck northwest from here on January 23, 2012.

Geography
Rock Creek is located at  (33.475884, -87.079003).

Demographics

2000 census
As of the census of 2000, there were 1,495 people, 569 households, and 458 families living in the CDP. The racial makeup of the CDP was 98.86% White, 0.27% Black or African American, 0.40% Native American, 0.07% Asian, 0.13% from other races, and 0.27% from two or more races. 0.54% of the population were Hispanic or Latino of any race.

There were 569 households, out of which 35.7% had children under the age of 18 living with them, 67.8% were married couples living together, 9.5% had a female householder with no husband present, and 19.5% were non-families. 17.9% of all households were made up of individuals, and 6.9% had someone living alone who was 65 years of age or older. The average household size was 2.63 and the average family size was 2.98.

In the CDP, the population was spread out, with 24.7% under the age of 18, 7.7% from 18 to 24, 29.9% from 25 to 44, 26.6% from 45 to 64, and 11.0% who were 65 years of age or older. The median age was 38 years. For every 100 females, there were 89.7 males. For every 100 females age 18 and over, there were 92.0 males.

The median income for a household in the CDP was $41,875, and the median income for a family was $49,375. Males had a median income of $35,294 versus $27,250 for females. The per capita income for the CDP was $33,333. About 6.2% of families and 3.8% of the population were below the poverty line, including none of those under age 18 and 7.9% of those age 65 or over.

2010 census
As of the census of 2010, there were 1,456 people, 576 households, and 447 families living in the CDP. There were 615 housing units at an average density of 205 per square mile (79/km). The racial makeup of the CDP was 97.5% White, 0.8% Black or African American, 0.7% Native American, 0.1% Asian, 0.0% from other races, and 0.8% from two or more races. 0.0% of the population were Hispanic or Latino of any race.

There were 576 households, out of which 27.8% had children under the age of 18 living with them, 63.0% were married couples living together, 9.9% had a female householder with no husband present, and 22.4% were non-families. 19.4% of all households were made up of individuals, and 7.7% had someone living alone who was 65 years of age or older. The average household size was 2.53 and the average family size was 2.90.

In the CDP, the population was spread out, with 20.5% under the age of 18, 7.5% from 18 to 24, 27.2% from 25 to 44, 28.8% from 45 to 64, and 16.0% who were 65 years of age or older. The median age was 41 years. For every 100 females, there were 93.6 males. For every 100 females age 18 and over, there were 97.2 males.

The median income for a household in the CDP was $43,370, and the median income for a family was $44,321. Males had a median income of $44,500 versus $38,244 for females. The per capita income for the CDP was $19,878. About 8.4% of families and 8.0% of the population were below the poverty line, including 8.0% of those under age 18 and 0% of those age 65 or over.

2020 census

As of the 2020 United States census, there were 1,471 people, 645 households, and 443 families residing in the CDP.

References

Census-designated places in Jefferson County, Alabama
Census-designated places in Alabama
Birmingham metropolitan area, Alabama